"My Love, My Life" is a song recorded by ABBA for their album, Arrival. The song was written by Benny Andersson and Björn Ulvaeus.

Background 
"My Love, My Life" was one of the last songs to be recorded for the album.
Agnetha Fältskog sings lead vocals and Björn Ulvaeus proclaimed the song to be the finest example of Agnetha's vocal purity.. He also expressed reservations about how the song was arranged. A complete demo with the original "Monsieur, Monsieur" lyrics was recorded before this, and remains unreleased.

Composition
According to sheet music published at Sheetmusicdirect.com by Union Songs, "My Love, My Life" is a slow tempo of 68 beats per minute. Written in common time, the song is in the key of C major. Agnetha Fältskog's vocal range spans from G3 to E5 during the song.

Mamma Mia! Here We Go Again version
Lily James, Amanda Seyfried and Meryl Streep recorded My Love, My Life for the soundtrack of Mamma Mia! Here We Go Again. Their version was released on July 13, 2018 alongside the rest of the soundtrack, by Capitol and Polydor Records. It was produced by Benny Andersson. This version featured new lyrics written by Björn Ulvaeus.

Charts

References

External links
https://web.archive.org/web/20080718201231/http://abba-world.server101.com/

ABBA songs
1976 songs
Songs written by Benny Andersson and Björn Ulvaeus
Songs written by Stig Anderson